My New Partner II is a 1990 French comedy film directed by Claude Zidi, starring Philippe Noiret and Thierry Lhermitte. It is a sequel to My New Partner.

Cast
 Philippe Noiret - René Boirond
 Thierry Lhermitte - François Lesbuche
 Guy Marchand - Guy Brisson
 Jean-Pierre Castaldi - Jean-Pierre Portal
 Grace de Capitani - Natacha
 Line Renaud - Simone
 Michel Aumont - Bloret
 Jean-Claude Brialy - The banker
 Jean Benguigui - Cesarini
 Roger Jendly - Albert Le Fourgue
 Alain Mottet - The prefect

Reception
The film opened at number one at the box office in Paris, grossing 7.6 million French franc ($1.33 million) in its opening week from 47 theatres.

External links

References

1990s buddy comedy films
1990s buddy cop films
Films directed by Claude Zidi
French comedy films
1990s French-language films
French satirical films
Films scored by Francis Lai
1990s satirical films
1990 comedy films
1990 films
1990s French films